The Grenoble tramway is the tram system in the city of Grenoble in the Rhône-Alpes region of France. In 1987, Grenoble became the second French city to reintroduce trams, the first being the Nantes tramway.

The tramway is operated by the Société d'économie mixte des transports publics de l'agglomération grenobloise (SÉMITAG) on behalf of the Communauté d'agglomération Grenoble Alpes Métropole, the intercommunal structure linking the commune of Grenoble and its suburbs. SÉMITAG operates its services, which includes local bus services as well as the tramway, under the Tag brand.

History 

Trams were first introduced to Grenoble in 1894, and this first generation tram system survived until 1952.

Network 
The current network comprises 93 stations, 12 of which are shared by two lines:
 Line A has 31 stations.
 Line B has 22 stations.
 Line C has 19 stations.
 Line D has 6 stations.
 Line E has 17 stations.

Rolling stock 
The Grenoble tramway is served by a total of 103 trams. The older 53 are Alsthom TFS trams, whilst the newer 50, which began entering service with the opening of the B line extension and the C line, are Alstom Citadis trams.

Alsthom TFS 

The Alsthom TFS fleet consists of 53 trams numbered from 2001 to 2053 running on all four lines of the network. They were introduced in successive steps as follows:
 Series Grenoble 1 (trams 2001 to 2020) introduced in 1986/1987 
 Series Grenoble 2 (trams 2021 to 2035) introduced in 1989/1990
 Series Grenoble 3 (trams 2036 to 2038) introduced in  1992
 Series Grenoble 4 (trams 2039 to 2053) introduced in 1995/1996

Alstom Citadis 

The Alstom Citadis fleet is composed of 50 trams numbered from 6001 to 6050, and circulates on the A, B and C lines. There are several series:
 Grenoble 1 (trams numbers 6001 to 6035) entered service in 2005
 Grenoble 2 (trams 6036 to 6050) entered service 4 May 2009, introducing Citadis trams on Line A
 Trams 6018-6020 were used for the inauguration of the C Line, on 20 May 2006. They carried a multicolor floral decoration for a few months, echoing the slogan "A flower for the city" used during the line's construction.

Future extensions 
 Line A extended by two stops from its current terminus at Denis Papin, Échirolles to the neighbouring commune of Pont-de-Claix, with completion expected at the end of 2019. Proposals have also been floated since 2001 to extend Line A at the opposite end towards Sassenage, but no concrete studies have been put in place as of 2017.
 Extensions to line D, probably from Saint-Martin-d'Hères to Grand'Place or/and from the university campus towards Meylan are also planned, but have not been decided.
 A preliminary study was made in 2012 to extend line E to Pont-de-Claix.

A tram-train linking Moirans to the centre of Grenoble as well as one linking Crolles and Grenoble have been studied, but the former project has been set aside due to current saturation of that train line by longer distance traffic. A link from Grenoble to Vizille via Pont-de-Claix, Jarrie and Champ-sur-Drac is also under consideration.

Network Map

See also 
 Trams in France
 List of town tramway systems in France
 Ancient tramway of Grenoble

External links 

  
 Railway-Technology.com on Grenoble
 NYCSubway.org on Grenoble

 
Transport in Grenoble
Tram transport in France
Railway companies established in 1987
Grenoble